Manni is a town in the Manni Department of Gnagna Province in eastern Burkina Faso. It is the capital of Manni Department and has a population of 15,066.

References

External links
Satellite map at Maplandia.com

Populated places in the Est Region (Burkina Faso)
Gnagna Province